Hilt Cirque is the west-most cirque of The Fortress in the Cruzen Range of Victoria Land. Named by the Advisory Committee on Antarctic Names in 2005 after Lieutenant (jg) J.W. Hilt, U.S. Navy, pilot of the VX-6 Otter aircraft that obtained low-elevation oblique aerial photographs of Saint Johns Range, Willett Range and Cruzen Range on November 20, 1959.

References

Landforms of Victoria Land